PSV Nickerie (Politie Sportvereniging) is a Surinamese football club from Nieuw Nickerie, currently playing in the district league of the Nickerie Voetbal Bond. The team play their home games at the Nickerie Voetbal Stadion to a capacity of 3,400 people.

History
Founded on 26 October 2000, PSV Nickerie are not the first football club of a Surinamese police force to participate in the higher levels of football in Suriname. In 1924 S.P.S.V. (Surinaamse Politie Sport Vereniging) was founded in the capital city Paramaribo, and served as the football club of the local police. The club name was then changed to P.V.V. (Politie Voetbal Vereniging) on 6 February 1945. The police force in Nieuw Nickerie registered their sports club in 2000 and were able to clinch the Lidbondentoernooi only 6 years later, thus promoting to the SVB Eerste Klasse, the 2nd tier of football in Suriname. The football kits of the club are manufactured by Italian sportswear company Lotto.

Honours

 Lidbondentoernooi: 1
2006

References

PSV Nickerie
Football clubs in Nieuw Nickerie
2000 establishments in Suriname
Police association football clubs